Mons Herodotus is a small lunar mountain north of the crater Herodotus.  It lies on the rugged Aristarchus Plateau and rises approximately 1 km above the surrounding terrain.

References

Herodotus, Mons